Sławienko  (German Ehrenfeld) is a village in the administrative district of Gmina Rudnik, within Racibórz County, Silesian Voivodeship, in southern Poland.

Gallery

References

Villages in Racibórz County